Zaza "Grom" Tkeshelashvili (Georgian: ზაზა ტყეშელაშვილი; born March 19, 1965) is a Georgian retired Freestyle wrestling Olympic competitor (100 kg) for Georgia in 1996 Olympic Games Atlanta and mixed martial artist. He formerly competed in the Heavyweight (MMA) division, most of which he fought with Fighting Network RINGS where he was known as Zaza Grom. He lost his last fight at Rings Lithuania – Bushido Rings 2 against Volk Han on August 5, 2001. He holds notable wins over Volk Han and Travis Fulton, and has fought Bobby Hoffman and Renato Sobral. His brother Koba Tkeshelashvili is also mixed martial artist and has competed in RINGS.

Biography
Zaza has been active in wrestling since 1978 as part of the Trudovije reserve center under coach Vano Nikoladze. He was one of eight wrestlers selected for the Georgian Olympic Team in 1996. He beat Daniel Sánchez (Cuba), Dolgorsürengiin Sumyaabazar (Mongolia) and was defeated in the semis by Leri Khabelov (Russia).

He is also mentioned in an interview with Australian fighter Chris Haseman where he comments on Zaza's (referring to him as Zaza Grom) Olympic credentials while telling a story of Rings Teams competitions, which were a 3 on 3 team eliminator event divided up by countries of origin. The rules were that the winner of the match stayed and fought the next member of a team.

"Well, the Georgians sent of Tariel Bitsadze, the team captain.  So me being the Australian captain, picked Dan Higgins, he tapped out after about 30 seconds from a choke, so I then picked Troy (Haseman Chris' brother).  He did exceptionally well, he lasted about a minute, he got knocked out, and then I looked around and I was the only one left.  We were lucky that Bitsadze, being so big was getting tired, he had fought for a whole minute and a half.  I was lucky enough to get around him he was like a huge tree, I hung onto his legs until he fell down, I jumped on him and choked him out.  The crowd went nuts, I went nuts, until I turned around and here was his brother (Zaza). I got knocked out cold.  The funny thing was that the entire tournament had to stop because the other two Georgian fighters didn’t even bother to get changed for the fight because they thought Bitsadze would clean house."*

 Paraphrased with some References, explanations and mistakes fixed (The Australian interviewer had issues spelling the Georgian names correctly.)

He is also a fully qualified veterinarian and physical education teacher both of which he still continues to do.

On October 28, 1999, Tkeshelashvili participated in RINGS'S first King of Kings tournament, being placed against luta livre fighter Renato Sobral in the first round. Zaza was the first and taking down his opponent and immediately attempted an ankle lock, following with a scarf hold when it failed. However, as they became entangled in the ring ropes, and after the restart Renato took his back, trying an armbar and an inverted triangle choke to no avail. At the second round, Zaza was caught in a Kimura lock and was forced to give up.

Mixed martial arts record

|-
| Loss
| align=center | 9-6
| Volk Han
| Submission (armlock)
| Rings Lithuania: Bushido Rings 2
| 
| align=center | 1
| align=center | N/A
| Vilnius, Lithuania
|
|-
| Loss
| align=center | 9-5
| Kiyoshi Tamura
| Decision (unanimous)
| Rings: King of Kings 2000 Block A
| 
| align=center | 2
| align=center | 5:00
| Tokyo, Japan
|
|-
| Loss
| align=center | 9-4
| Volk Han
| Submission (guillotine choke)
| Rings: Russia vs. Georgia
| 
| align=center | 1
| align=center | 15:46
| Tula, Russia
|
|-
| Win
| align=center | 9-3
| Travis Fulton
| Submission (achilles lock)
| Rings Russia: Russia vs. The World
| 
| align=center | 1
| align=center | 0:34
| Yekaterinburg, Russia
|
|-
| Loss
| align=center | 8-3
| Bobby Hoffman
| KO (punch)
| Rings: King of Kings 1999 Final
| 
| align=center | 1
| align=center | 0:34
| Tokyo, Japan
|
|-
| Loss
| align=center | 8-2
| Renato Sobral
| Submission (kimura)
| Rings: King of Kings 1999 Block A
| 
| align=center | 2
| align=center | 1:11
| Tokyo, Japan
|
|-
| Win
| align=center | 8-1
| Volk Han
| KO
| Rings: Rings Georgia
| 
| align=center | 1
| align=center | 7:08
|  Georgia
|
|-
| Win
| align=center | 7-1
| Volk Han
| Decision (unanimous)
| Rings: Rise 4th
| 
| align=center | 3
| align=center | 10:00
| Japan
|
|-
| Win
| align=center | 6-1
| Sander Thonhauser
| TKO (5 lost points)
| Rings: Rise 2nd
| 
| align=center | 1
| align=center | 4:02
| Japan
|
|-
| Win
| align=center | 5-1
| Joop Kasteel
| Submission
| Rings: Third Fighting Integration
| 
| align=center | 1
| align=center | 5:54
| Tokyo, Japan
|
|-
| Win
| align=center | 4-1
| Ricardo Morais
| Decision
| Rings – Mega Battle Tournament 1997 Semifinal
| 
| align=center | 1
| align=center | 20:00
| Japan
|
|-
| Win
| align=center | 3-1
| Masayuki Naruse
| KO (punch)
| Rings – Budokan Hall 1997
| 
| align=center | N/A
| align=center | N/A
| Budokan Hall Tokyo, Japan
|
|-
| Loss
| align=center | 2-1
| Andrei Kopylov
| KO (punch)
| Rings – Battle Dimensions Tournament 1995 Opening Round
| 
| align=center | N/A
| align=center | N/A
| Japan
|
|-
| Win
| align=center | 2-0
| Yoshihisa Yamamoto
| KO (punch)
| Rings: Battle Dimensions Tournament 1994 Opening Round
| 
| align=center | N/A
| align=center | N/A
| Japan
|
|-
| Win
| align=center | 1-0
| Chris Dolman
| KO (punch)
| Rings: Battle Dimensions Tournament 1992 Opening Round
| 
| align=center | N/A
| align=center | N/A
| Japan
|

References

External links
 

Male mixed martial artists from Georgia (country)
Heavyweight mixed martial artists
Mixed martial artists utilizing freestyle wrestling
Olympic wrestlers of Georgia (country)
Wrestlers at the 1996 Summer Olympics
Male sport wrestlers from Georgia (country)
Living people
1965 births
People from Vani